Lafresnaye's woodcreeper (Xiphorhynchus guttatus guttatoides) is a resident passerine bird found in tropical South America in the western and southern Amazon and adjacent sections of the Cerrado. It is often considered a subspecies of the buff-throated woodcreeper, but this combined "species" would be polyphyletic. It includes the dusky-billed woodcreeper (Xiphorhynchus guttatoides eytoni), which sometimes is considered a separate species (see Taxonomy).

Description
With a total length of 25–28 cm (10–11 in), this woodcreeper is, together with buff-throated woodcreeper, the largest member of the genus Xiphorhynchus. The wings and tail are rufous. The head, mantle and underparts are olive-brown streaked buff (subspecies X. g. guttatoides and X. g. dorbignyanus) or whitish (X. g. eytoni, X. g. gracilirostris and X. g. vicinalis). The bill is long, slightly decurved, and hooked at the tip. The bill is mainly pale horn (X. g. guttatoides and X. g. dorbignyanus) or blackish (X. g. eytoni, X. g. gracilirostris and X. g. vicinalis).

Ecology
The Lafresnaye's woodcreeper is restricted to forest and woodland. In its range, it is generally the commonest large woodcreeper. It is an insectivores, which feeds on ants and other insects and spiders. It feeds low in trees, usually alone, but groups will follow columns of army ants. The species builds a bark-lined nest in a tree hole or hollow stump and lays two white eggs.

Taxonomy
The taxonomy is highly complex. It has often been considered a subspecies of the buff-throated woodcreeper, but molecular data indicates that this species is closer the cocoa woodcreeper than it is to Lafresnaye's woodcreeper.Aleixo, Alexandre (2002b): Molecular Systematics and the Role of the "Várzea"-"Terra-Firme" Ecotone in the Diversification of Xiphorhynchus Woodcreepers (Aves: Dendrocolaptidae). Auk 119(3): 621-640. DOI: 10.1642/0004-8038(2002)119[0621:MSATRO]2.0.CO;2 HTML abstract Alternatively, the eytoni group (incl. vicinalis and gracilirostris) has been considered a separate species, the dusky-billed woodcreeper (Xiphorhynchus (guttatoides) eytoni), but, despite its different looks, it is better considered a subspecies of the Lafresnaye's woodcreeper.

Biogeography and molecular data suggest that the relationship between these taxa and the buff-throated woodcreeper deserves further study.

References

Hilty, Steven L. (2003): Birds of Venezuela''. Christopher Helm, London. 

Lafresnaye's woodcreeper
Birds of South America
Birds of Bolivia
Birds of Brazil
Birds of the Amazon Basin
Birds of the Cerrado
Birds of the Pantanal
Lafresnaye's woodcreeper